Proceratophrys brauni is a species of frog in the family Odontophrynidae. It is endemic to South Brazil and has been recorded in the Paraná, Santa Catarina, and Rio Grande do Sul states. The specific name brauni honors Pedro Canisio Braun, a Brazilian herpetologist. Common name horn toad has been coined for this species.

Description
Adult males measure  and adult females  in snout–vent length. The body is robust and stout. The snout is short but has a pointed tip in dorsal view. The eyes are large. The tympanum is scarcely visible. The arms and the legs short and robust; the toes are slightly webbed. The upper eyelids have usually three distinct protuberant tubercles. Dorsal skin is granular and warty, bearing variably arranged and sized tubercles and ridges. Two distinct longitudinal rows of tubercles extend from behind the upper eyelids over the dorsum to the vent, forming two curved ridges. Dorsal coloration is variable and consists of various shades of brown, tan, or gray, forming a regular pattern of longitudinally arranged dark and light brown markings. The lower surfaces are predominantly black but have a variable distinct pattern of bright red or orange-red blotches and spots on chest and venter. Proceratophrys brauni females are significantly larger than males. Finger length, tip of snout, and tubercles on eyelids are characteristics that vary slightly from a male and female.

Habitat and conservation
Outside the breeding season, it is terrestrial and occurs in the leaf-litter. Breeding takes place in small streams in conjunction with heavy rains, and the eggs may be deposited under stones of stream beds.

It is a common species that occurs in several protected areas. Nevertheless, habitat loss caused by deforestation is a major threat.

References

brauni
Endemic fauna of Brazil
Amphibians of Brazil
Amphibians described in 2001
Taxonomy articles created by Polbot